Ropsten metro station is the end station on line 13 on the red line of the Stockholm metro, located in the district of Ropsten. The station was opened on 2 September 1967 as the northeastern terminus of the extension from Östermalmstorg.

The station was sited about 10–15 meters above street level as a preparation for an extension to Lidingö on a new bridge. There are now no plans for such an extension and the lines end in mid-air.

The Ropsten station also includes the end stop on the Lidingöbanan tramway, a few meters about the street.

On street level there are many bus stops for buses towards Lidingö.

References

External links
Images of Ropsten

Red line (Stockholm metro) stations
Railway stations opened in 1967